Boutaleb may refer to:

 Boutaleb, a town and commune in Algeria ;
 Abdelhadi Boutaleb (1923-2009), a Moroccan statesman and politician.
 General Ahmed Boutaleb, commander of the Royal Moroccan Air Force
 Ahmed Aboutaleb, Dutch politician and Mayor of Rotterdam
 Karima Boutaleb (born 1979), French artist and curator